Ginásio do Ibirapuera, officially named Ginásio Estadual Geraldo José de Almeida is an indoor sporting arena located in São Paulo, Brazil. The seating capacity of the arena is 11,000 people and it was opened on 25 January 1957. It is used mostly for volleyball matches.

Events
Named after famous sports broadcaster and sports commentator Geraldo José de Almeida, in 2004, 2005 and 2006 Ginásio do Ibirapuera hosted the Salonpas Cup matches, and in 2006, the arena hosted the Basketball World Championship for Women. Other notable basketball events include the 1973 Intercontinental Cup, the 1979 edition of the competition in which local E.C. Sírio won the title after a memorable win over Bosna Sarajevo, and the 1984 edition of the same competition in which Banco Roma won the title.

The venue has hosted many international concerts, such as A-ha, Santana, Van Halen, Metallica, Cyndi Lauper, Sade, Michael Bublé, Queen + Adam Lambert and more.

The venue will also host an event of Valorant's esports, the VCT LOCK//IN, featuring all 30 of the tour's partnered teams.

See also
List of indoor arenas in Brazil

References

External links

Stadium info at São Paulo state's government official website 
Stadium website
Venue information

Indoor arenas in Brazil
Sports venues in São Paulo
Basketball venues in Brazil